The 8th Canadian Infantry Division was a military formation of the Canadian Army that served within Pacific Command in Western Canada during World War II. The Division units were raised on 18 March 1942 and the HQ was raised on 12 May 1942 at Prince George, BC. The Division was a home defence unit, initially consisting of the 19th, 20th, and 21st Canadian Infantry Brigades. In July the home Defence Divisions were reorganised and the 8th Division consisted of the 14th and 16th Infantry Brigades. The 19th Brigade went to the 6th Canadian Infantry Division, the 20th went to the 7th Canadian Infantry Division, and the 21st would remain at Valcartier, PQ as a strategic reserve. The 8th Canadian Infantry Division was disbanded on 15 October 1943, along with the 16th Brigade. The 14th Brigade returned to the 6th Division.

Throughout its relatively brief existence, the division was commanded by Major General Hardy N. Ganong.

Order of battle
June 1942

 Headquarters, 8th Division 
 8th Division Intelligence Section 
 No. 8 Field Security Section 
 No. 8 Defence and Employment Platoon (Lorne Scots)
 Machine Gun Battalion -The Prince of Wales Rangers (MG)
 19th Brigade 
 3rd Battalion, Irish Fusiliers of Canada
 Winnipeg Light Infantry
 Prince Albert Volunteers
 No. 19 Defence Platoon
 20th Brigade 
 3rd Battalion, The Queen's Own Rifles
 3rd Battalion, The Royal Winnipeg Rifles
 2nd/10th Dragoons
 No. 20 Defence Platoon
 21st Brigade 
 3rd Battalion, Les Fusiliers Mont-Royal
 3rd Battalion, Le Regiment de Maisonneuve
 Le Regiment de Levis
 No. 21 Defence Platoon

Units of the supporting arms included:

 Royal Canadian Artillery: 
 Headquarters, Eighth Divisional Artillery, RCA 
 25th Field Regiment
 114th Field Battery 
 115th Field Battery 
 116th Field Battery 
 26th Field Regiment
 117th Field Battery 
 118th Field Battery 
 119th Field Battery 
 27th Field Regiment
 120th Field Battery 
 121st Field Battery 
 122nd Field Battery
 Corps of Royal Canadian Engineers: 
 Headquarters 8th Divisional Engineers, RCE 
 21st Field Company, RCE 
 24th Field Company, RCE
 Royal Canadian Corps of Signals: 
 Headquarters 8th Divisional Signals RCCS
 Canadian Provost Corps: 
 Provost Company

Plus units of the RCASC, RCAMC, RCOC, CPC, etc.

References

Infantry divisions of Canada
Canadian World War II divisions
Military units and formations established in 1942
Military units and formations disestablished in 1943
Military units and formations of the British Empire in World War II